Dmitri Olegovich Podruzhko (born 2 June 1986) is a former Russian professional football player.

Club career
He made his Russian Football National League debut for FC Chernomorets Novorossiysk on 17 September 2004 in a game against FC Dynamo Bryansk. He played 6 seasons in the FNL for 5 different clubs.

Personal life
His father Oleg Podruzhko played football professionally.

External links
 

1986 births
People from Cherepovets
Living people
Russian footballers
Association football midfielders
FC Chernomorets Novorossiysk players
FC Kuban Krasnodar players
FC Lada-Tolyatti players
FC Luch Vladivostok players
FC Ufa players
FC Armavir players
FC Orenburg players
FC Nosta Novotroitsk players
Sportspeople from Vologda Oblast